Aloeus (Ancient Greek: Ἀλωεύς probably derived from ἀλοάω aloaō "to thresh, to tread" as well as "to crush, to smash") can indicate one of the two characters in Greek mythology:

Aloeus or Haloeus, a Thessalian prince as the son of Poseidon and princess Canace, daughter of King Aeolus and Enarete. He was the brother of Hopleus, Nireus, Epopeus and Triops. His first wife was his niece Iphimedeia, and later Eriboea, daughter of Eurymachus. In some accounts, Aloeus was the father of Salmoneus who founded Elis, the girls Elate and Platanus, and the twin giants, Otus and Ephialtes, collectively known as the Aloadae. These giants made war on the gods and captured the god Ares in a bag. Aloeus's wife Eeriboea reported this to the gods, for which Aloeus had her flayed alive. In Virgil's Aeneid, the sons of Aloeus were found in the underworld and there Aeneas sees them being punished by Rhadamanthus. This scene from Virgil was a precursor to Dante's depiction of Hell. Aloeus was credited to have founded the city of Alus in Aetolia.
Aloeus, son of Helios and possibly Antiope or Perse, who received from his father the sovereignty over the district of Asopia (Sicyon). He was the father of Epopeus, his successor.

Notes

References 

 Apollodorus, The Library with an English Translation by Sir James George Frazer, F.B.A., F.R.S. in 2 Volumes, Cambridge, MA, Harvard University Press; London, William Heinemann Ltd. 1921. ISBN 0-674-99135-4. Online version at the Perseus Digital Library. Greek text available from the same website.
Homer, The Odyssey with an English Translation by A.T. Murray, PH.D. in two volumes. Cambridge, MA., Harvard University Press; London, William Heinemann, Ltd. 1919. Online version at the Perseus Digital Library. Greek text available from the same website.
 Pausanias, Description of Greece with an English Translation by W.H.S. Jones, Litt.D., and H.A. Ormerod, M.A., in 4 Volumes. Cambridge, MA, Harvard University Press; London, William Heinemann Ltd. 1918. . Online version at the Perseus Digital Library
Pausanias, Graeciae Descriptio. 3 vols. Leipzig, Teubner. 1903.  Greek text available at the Perseus Digital Library.
 Publius Vergilius Maro, Aeneid. Theodore C. Williams. trans. Boston. Houghton Mifflin Co. 1910. Online version at the Perseus Digital Library.
 Publius Vergilius Maro, Bucolics, Aeneid, and Georgics. J. B. Greenough. Boston. Ginn & Co. 1900. Latin text available at the Perseus Digital Library.

Children of Poseidon
Children of Helios
Demigods in classical mythology
Sicyonian characters in Greek mythology
Thessalian characters in Greek mythology
Thessalian mythology